John Francis Xavier McGohey (January 7, 1894 – July 7, 1972) was a United States district judge of the United States District Court for the Southern District of New York.

Education and career
McGohey was born in New York City and graduated from Xavier High School in 1913. He then received a Bachelor of Arts degree from Fordham University in 1917 and was in the United States Army during World War I from 1918 to 1919. He received a Bachelor of Laws from New York University School of Law in 1923. He was an assistant counsel to the Hearst Publishing Company from 1923 to 1924, and was then counsel to the New York City Board of Transportation until 1932. He was an assistant state attorney general of New York from 1933 to 1943, and was Chief Assistant United States Attorney of the Southern District of New York from 1944 to 1949.

Federal judicial service
McGohey received a recess appointment from President Harry S. Truman on October 21, 1949, to the United States District Court for the Southern District of New York, to a new seat authorized by 63 Stat. 493. He was nominated to the same position by President Truman on January 5, 1950. He was confirmed by the United States Senate on March 8, 1950, and received his commission on March 9, 1950. He assumed senior status on March 17, 1970. His service terminated on July 7, 1972, due to his death.

References

Sources

1894 births
1972 deaths
20th-century American judges
Fordham University alumni
New York University alumni
Judges of the United States District Court for the Southern District of New York
United States district court judges appointed by Harry S. Truman
United States Army soldiers
Assistant United States Attorneys
Xavier High School (New York City) alumni